Allal Bel Caid (born 25 December 1939) is a Moroccan basketball player. He competed in the men's tournament at the 1968 Summer Olympics.

References

External links
 

1939 births
Living people
Moroccan men's basketball players
Olympic basketball players of Morocco
Basketball players at the 1968 Summer Olympics
Sportspeople from Marrakesh